Do You Remember(?) may refer to:

 "Do You Remember" (Jay Sean song), 2009
 "Do You Remember" (Jarryd James song), 2015
 "Do You Remember?" (The Beach Boys song)
 "Do You Remember?" (Phil Collins song), 1990
 Do You Remember? (album), a 2002 remix album by Mac Dre
 "Do You Remember", a 2011 song by Ane Brun from the album It All Starts with One
 Do You Remember?, a British television series featuring Ian Holm
 "Do You Remember", a 2002 song by Aaron Carter
 "Do You Remember?", a song by Janis Ian from Who Really Cares
 "Do You Remember?", a song by Hüsker Dü from Everything Falls Apart
 "Do You Remember", a song by Blake Shelton from his album Based on a True Story...
 "Do You Remember" a.k.a. "Rock 'n Roll Medley" performed by  Long Tall Ernie and The Shakers in 1977
 "DoYouRemember?", a nostalgia focused American digital media organization